Kevin St John Dennis Emery (born 28 February 1960, Swindon, Wiltshire) is a retired  English first-class cricketer. He was a right-handed batsman who bowled right-arm fast-medium.

Emery played his entire first-class career for Hampshire, making his debut in May 1982 against Leicestershire and his one-day debut a few days later against Kent County Cricket Club. He also joined Warwickshire CCC in 1986 but a back injury restricted his appearances to the Second X1. After his First Class career ended he represented Wiltshire in Minor Counties cricket and played club cricket for Swindon CC, Lansdown CC (Bath), Optimists CC ( Bristol ), Calmore CC and Dumbleton CC. He also represented a Western League Select X1 and still plays out matches for the MCC.

Emery played in 30 first-class matches over two seasons and 25 List A matches over three seasons. He was used primarily as a bowler, taking 88 first-class wickets at an average of 25.35 and 27 one-day wickets at an average of 26.03. After the 1984 County Championship season, he was released by the club. Emery also represented England B in a match against the touring Pakistan team in 1982, taking 4 for 46 in the first innings, his victims including Mohsin Khan (who had just made a double hundred in a Test match), Wasim Raja, and Saleem Malik.

External links 
Kevin Emery at Cricinfo
Kevin Emery at CricketArchive
Matches and more detailed statistics

References 

1960 births
Living people
Sportspeople from Swindon
People from Wiltshire
English cricketers
Hampshire cricketers
Wiltshire cricketers